Olteț may refer to:

Olteț, a river in Gorj, Vâlcea and Olt Counties, Romania
Olteț, a village in the commune Viștea, Brașov County, Romania
Olteț, alternative name for the Drăguș River, Brașov County, Romania